Qareh Guni (also Romanized as Qareh Gūnī) is a village in Minjavan-e Sharqi Rural District, Minjavan District, Khoda Afarin County, East Azerbaijan Province, Iran. At the 2006 census, its population was 53, in 13 families. The village is populated by the Kurdish Mohammad Khanlu tribe.

References 

Populated places in Khoda Afarin County
Kurdish settlements in East Azerbaijan Province